West Main Street–West James Street Historic District is a national historic district located at Richfield Springs in Otsego County, New York.  It encompasses 58 contributing buildings and three eight contributing structures. The body of the district includes 21 businesses and 29 historic residences, a school, library, and a church complex.  The district incorporates the historic institutional and commercial core of the village and a significant residential neighborhood.

It was listed on the National Register of Historic Places in 1994.

References

Historic districts on the National Register of Historic Places in New York (state)
Houses on the National Register of Historic Places in New York (state)
Georgian architecture in New York (state)
Historic districts in Otsego County, New York
National Register of Historic Places in Otsego County, New York